Royal Air Force Birch or more simply RAF Birch is a former Royal Air Force station in Essex, England.

Opened in 1942 it was used by both the Royal Air Force and United States Army Air Forces.  During the war, it was used primarily as a reserve transport airfield. It was closed after the war, in late 1945.

Today, the remains of the airfield are located on private property and used as agricultural fields.

Royal Air Force use

The following units were here at some point:
 No. 48 Squadron RAF
 No. 233 Squadron RAF
 No. 381 Maintenance Unit RAF
 No. 382 Maintenance Unit RAF
 No. 383 Maintenance Unit RAF
 No. 384 Maintenance Unit RAF

United States Army Air Forces use

Birch was known as USAAF Station AAF-149 for security reasons by the USAAF during the war, and by which it was referred to instead of location. Its USAAF Station Code was "BR".

Current use
With the facility released from military control, the airfield was returned to agricultural use.

Today, most of the concreted areas have been removed for hardcore, leaving single tracked farm roads along the main runway, one secondary, and parts of the perimeter track.  Blind Lane (a public road) now runs along the other secondary (02/20) its original course having been taken when building the airfield.  Some hardstanding is also used by Essex Council for garden waste composting, the main site being accessed via the main runway. 
A few loop hardstands remain intact off the remains of the single-tracked perimeter track along the north side of the airfield.  However, other than these farm roads, there is little remaining of the wartime airfield that was never used, other than some ghostly disturbed areas in aerial photography of loop dispersal hardstands and the long since removed perimeter track.

See also

List of former Royal Air Force stations

References

Citations

Bibliography
Freeman, Roger A. (1978) Airfields of the Eighth: Then and Now. After the Battle 
Freeman, Roger A. (1991) The Mighty Eighth The Colour Record. Cassell & Co. 
Maurer, Maurer (1983). Air Force Combat Units of World War II. Maxwell AFB, Alabama: Office of Air Force History. .

External links

Photographs of RAF Birch from the Geograph British Isles project

Royal Air Force stations in Essex
Airfields of the 9th Bombardment Division in the United Kingdom
Royal Air Force stations of World War II in the United Kingdom